Shinde Stadium is a multi-use stadium in Mufulira, Zambia. It is currently used mostly for football matches and serves as the home for Mufulira Wanderers F.C. The stadium holds 5,000 people.

In April 1962, Wanderers' home ground Shinde Stadium was opened . It was Hastings George Camukongo Bwalya Mpolokoso(1916 -1979), an accomplished mid-field football player with Mufulira Black Pool and Mufulira Wanderers in the 1950s, School Teacher and Acting Headmaster at Luanshimba Primary School in Kabwe, School Teacher at Mufulira Mine School and at Buyantashi School in KamuChanga, Social Welfare Officer in Chibolya in Mufulira and Headmaster at Nkulumashiba Primary School in Luanshya, who named 'Shinde Stadium'. The late Mr. Bwalya Mpolokoso was given prize money of 3 British Pounds by Colonial Authorities. He appropriately named the stadium as 'Shinde' because the stadium opened in April and according to IciBemba, the month of April is called 'Shinde' . April is a  month which is  associated with green harvest, an abundance of farm produce, happiness and fulfilment among all people. In African tradition, good harvest, abundant food, good health, happiness and fulfilment, perched on thankful and prayerful hearts to Almighty the provider of all good things, is symbolic of a blessed people. With that promising and optimistic background, associated with a green harvest in the month of April, Mufulira Wanderers, passionately called by supporters as 'Mighty Mufulira Wanderers' relaunched itself as a team of reckon and high level success, in a stadium, which provided a fulfilling atmosphere, enjoyed by both player and spectator, in everlasting resonance. The club from Shinde was catapulted to greater heights of achievement by a popular  statement of belief, 'Ba Mighty ba wina icungulo' (IciBemba, meaning, ' Mighty wins when the Sun goes down'). The club from Shinde went on to win great games at home and away. This brought happiness to supporters and contributed to high levels of production, especially in Mufulira mines, throughout the years.

With no doubt, the club from Shinde Stadium went on to be the most successful football club in terms of high caliber footballers, high performance and victories, inspired by April vibes. Arguably, the club from Shinde, has contributed the best players of all time and footballing giants in the history of football in Zambia, including the likes of Mr Samuel 'Zoom' Ndhlovu,  Nkole brothers( Abraham, Patrick, Edward and Godfrey), Mr Ackim Musenge, Mr Dickson Makwaza, Mr Dick Chama, Charles Musonda, Ashios Melu, Efford Chabala, and the most famous football icon in Zambia, Kalusha Bwalya, popularly referred to as 'Great Kalu'.

Football venues in Zambia
Buildings and structures in Copperbelt Province